Bill Cooper (born July 12, 1939), nicknamed "Cannonball", is a former American football fullback and linebacker. He was initiated to the College Football Hall of Fame in 2000. He played professionally with the San Francisco 49ers.

References

1939 births
Living people
American football fullbacks
Muskingum Fighting Muskies football players
San Francisco 49ers players
College Football Hall of Fame inductees
People from Carrollton, Ohio